Thomas Howley (birth unknown – death unknown) was a Welsh rugby union, and professional rugby league footballer who played in the 1910s and 1920s.

Playing career

International honours
Thomas Howley won 4 caps for Wales (RL) in 1921–1925 while at Wigan, and won caps for England (RL) while at Wigan in 1924 against Australia (3 matches), and New Zealand (3 matches).

Championship final appearances
Thomas Howley played right-, i.e. number 3, and scored a drop goal in Wigan's 13-2 victory over Oldham in the Championship Final during the 1921–22 season at The Cliff, Broughton on Saturday 6 May 1922, and played right-, i.e. number 3, and scored a 2-tries in the 22-10 victory over Warrington in the Championship Final during the 1925–26 season at Knowsley Road, St. Helens on Saturday 8 May 1926.

County Cup Final appearances
Thomas Howley played left-, i.e. number 4, and scored a try in Wigan's 20–2 victory over Leigh in the 1922–23 Lancashire County Cup Final during the 1922–23 season at The Willows, Salford on Saturday 25 November 1922, and played right-, i.e. number 3, in the 11-15 defeat by Swinton in the 1925–26 Lancashire County Cup Final during the 1925–26 season at The Cliff, Broughton on Wednesday 9 December 1925

References

External links
!Great Britain Statistics at englandrl.co.uk (statistics currently missing due to not having appeared for both Great Britain, and England)
Statistics at wigan.rlfans.com

Ebbw Vale RFC players
Footballers who switched code
Great Britain national rugby league team players
Place of birth missing
Place of death missing
Rugby league centres
Rugby league wingers
Wales national rugby league team players
Welsh rugby league players
Welsh rugby union players
Wigan Warriors players
Year of birth missing
Year of death missing